Boran cattle are a popular Zebu beef breed in eastern Africa.

Through DNA sampling, Hanotte et al. have analyzed the genetic make-up of the Boran and it consists of the following genetic proportions—64% Bos indicus, 24% European Bos taurus and 12% African Bos taurus.

History
Kenyan Boran cattle were developed from the native shorthorned Zebu cattle of the Borana Oromo people of southern Ethiopia.  They are usually white or fawn, with the bulls being darker with black point.  Their great similarity to the American Brahman cattle is not without basis, they are also descended from cattle from the western coast of India, only much earlier.

Since 1951, the Boran Cattle Breeders' Society has been managed and strategically breeding Boran cattle in Kenya. As of 2008, there were approximately 454 beef ranches in the country, which can be classified based on ownership as one of five categories: group ranches, private company ranches, co-operative ranches, public company ranches, and government ranches.

Physical characteristics 
Having been in Africa for over a thousand years, they are very well adapted to local conditions and parasites. Boran cattle are known for their fertility, early maturation (more so than other Zebu breeds), hardiness, and docility.

Types
The Orma Boran is the smallest of the Boran breeds, smaller than the Kenyan Boran.

The Kenyan Boran developed from the Orma Boran, Borana, and Somali Boran. The Kenyan Boran is differentiated from other Boran due to its size and well-developed hindquarters. The Kenyan Boran coat colour is usually white with spots, but  brown and red coat colours have  also been found.

Parasites 
Boran have very little trypanotolerance, although surprisingly they do carry a few alleles which are specific to Boran and could be useful for introgression into other breeds. As Boran are not entirely derived from extra-African forebears, and have spent some of their formation time as a breed within Africa, it is possible that this is the result of selection against trypanosomiasis challenge.

References

External links 
 Boran Cattle Breeders Society Kenya
 Boran Breeders South-Africa

Cattle breeds
Cattle breeds originating in Kenya